Expedition Robinson 2004, was the eighth season of Expedition Robinson, or Survivor as it is referred to in some countries, to air in Sweden and it aired starting on 13 September 2004 airing four episodes a week (Monday through Thursday with a new episode each day and a re-airing of all recent episodes on Saturdays) and was broadcast until 4 December 2004.

Overview 
The major twist this season was that of "Team X", a team composed of five wildcard contestants who entered the game in episode 3 to compete against the original two teams. Joker Johnny Leinonen also entered the competition in episode cycle 3 as part of the South team after buying his spot in the contest. Along with this twist, from episode 3 on any contestant voted out of either of the original teams would be sent to Team X to compete in a duel with a member of Team X (chosen by the last person to win a duel).

Another twist that occurred in the same episode cycle was Frida Lundell's re-entrance into the competition following the voluntary exit of Tina Dadasvand. As an unexpected twist, Frida Lundell sold her spot in the game in episode cycle 4 in exchange for a sum of money. Following the sudden ejection of newer Team X members Gabriella Kopasz and Nicholas Nath due to rule breaking, the recently eliminated Rasmus Nilsson and Maryam "Shante" Shekhanzai returned to the game.

Following the initial merge of the North and South teams, the Robinson tribe competed against Team X in immunity challenges. If Team X won the challenge, then Robinson would be forced to vote out one of their members (or send them to duel someone in Team X), but if Robinson won they would vote to send one of their team members to Team X. When a second merge occurred in episode cycle nine, it was revealed to the contestants that recently eliminated contestants Jerry Forsberg, Johanna Hakala, Dan Karlsson, Johnny Leinonen, Mikael Lundell, and Rasmus Nilsson had been moved to a secret location called "Calm Island", where they had been competing for two spots in the final merge tribe. Of the six competing for the two spots, only Dan Karlsson and Mikael Lundell were successful in earning spots in the Robinson tribe.

At the end of the season, both the jury and the public were allowed to vote two of the eliminated contestants back into the game for the final four. The public chose Johanna, while the jury voted Jerry back into the game. In addition to this the public was allowed to allot ten jury votes among the two final contestants through the results of a public vote. Jerry Forsberg eventually won the season with a jury vote of 11–9 over Fike Najafi. Jerry received three of the public votes to Fike's seven.

Finishing order

The game

Voting history

 During the first week of the competition the contestants competed as individuals in a series of challenges. The contestants were led to believe these challenges would ultimately result in the elimination of one or more contestants from the game. In reality, the contestants that lost these challenges were sent to "Goal" where members of the South Team would ultimately live.
 As he won the North Team's individual immunity challenge, Jerry had immunity at the second tribal council.
 As he won the North Team's individual immunity challenge, Mikael had immunity at the third tribal council. As punishment for coming in second at the challenge Gabriella had a black vote cast against her at tribal council.
 Frida sold her in spot in the game in an auction to Johnny. 
 As he won the South Team's individual immunity challenge, Dan had immunity at the fourth tribal council. As punishment for coming in second at the challenge Belina had a black vote cast against her at tribal council.
 As he won the North Team's individual immunity challenge, Jerry had immunity at the fifth tribal council. As punishment for coming in second at the challenge Fike had a black vote cast against him at tribal council.
 When the North and South teams merged to compete with Lag X they formed the Robinson Tribe. Upon the merger, the tribe was told that they would have to vote to send two of their members to Lag X. 
 As he won Lag X's individual immunity challenge, Rasmus had immunity at the sixth tribal council.
 As he won the Robinson Tribe's individual immunity challenge, Fike had immunity at the seventh tribal council.
 As he won the Robinson Tribe's individual immunity challenge, Fike had immunity at the seventh tribal council.
 Prior to the merge of the Robinson Tribe and Lag X a series of duels took place. The winners of these duels remained in the game while the losers were sent to Comfort Island. In addition to the duels there were several choices given to the tribes to decide whom to eliminate from their tribe. The eliminated contestants were also sent to Comfort Island. Just prior to the merge it was revealed to the contestants that the duel losers had been sent to Comfort Island and they were told they would have to vote one person from either tribe to be the last person sent to Comfort Island. Once all members were on Comfort Island where they competed in a series of challenges. The winner of these challenges would then vote out one of the losers. In the last challenge the contestant that came in last was automatically eliminated. While the first and second-place finishers returned to Robinson Tribe.
 At what the contestants thought was the final tribal council it was revealed that a secret pact had been made by Carro, Dan, Fike, Mikael and Shante to split the million Krona prize if one of them ultimately won. As this was against the rules, it was announced that two of jury members would re-enter the game for a chance to become one of the finalist. The first re-entry was decided by a jury vote in which the jurors were each given the chance to vote for any juror other than themselves that they'd like to see return to the game. The second contestant to re-enter was decided via a series of public votes that eventually came down to the three most popular jurors.
 During the live final the four finalists competed in plank where the first two to fall were eliminated. The last two contestants on the plank each earned the right to eliminate one juror from voting eligibility. Fike chose Shante while Jerry chose Dan. Further, the public vote was allowed to allocate ten votes between the two finalist based on voting percentages. Fike received 7 of these votes while Jerry received 3.

External links
http://wwwc.aftonbladet.se/noje/tv/doku/2002/robinson/robinson.html
http://www2.unt.se/avd/1,,MC=5-AV_ID=345050,00.html
http://www.aftonbladet.se/nojesbladet/article503086.ab?service=gallery&start=1
https://web.archive.org/web/20110704150847/http://www.alltomtv.se/f100.html

 2004
2004 Swedish television seasons